HIP 56948 (also known as HD 101364) is a solar twin star of type G5V. It is one of the most Sun-like stars yet known in terms of size, mass, temperature, and chemical makeup. The Sun is about 4.6 billion years old, and HIP 56948 is believed to be about 7.1 billion years old. Both stars are between a third and a halfway through their life on the main sequence.

It is 208 light years away in the constellation of Draco, lying about halfway between Polaris and Dubhe on the celestial sphere. Astronomers have looked for planets in the system, so far without finding any. These observations suggest that the star does not have any hot Jupiters.

Jorge Meléndez of the Australian National University and Iván Ramírez of the University of Texas analysed the star in 2007 using the 2.7 metre Harlan J. Smith telescope at McDonald Observatory.

Most other solar analogs such as 18 Scorpii are unlike the Sun in that they have several times the lithium abundance.  HIP 56948 is among the best candidates for a solar twin because of the known possible contenders, its lithium abundance most resembles that of the Sun. A 2009 high-dispersion spectroscopic study from the Astronomical Society of Japan confirms this.

In the abstract to their paper, the star's discoverers say:

See also
Planetary habitability
Rare Earth hypothesis

Notes

References

Draco (constellation)
G-type main-sequence stars
Solar twins
101364
056948
BD+69 0620